A pork ball is a Chinese meatball made from finely minced pork, starch, and sometimes cuttlefish to impart a "chewy" texture and added flavour. 

Pork balls are a common part of the cuisines of Taiwan, China, and other parts of Asia, including Malaysia, Singapore, Indonesia in
Bali and Thailand. They are particularly popular in the Taiwanese city of Hsinchu, where an annual festival is dedicated to them. The name originally derives from Taiwanese: 摃 (to pound with a mallet) + 丸 (ball).  However, the first character is usually rendered as 貢 (tribute, gifts) because its Mandarin pronunciation more closely matches the Taiwanese pronunciation of 摃. 

In Taiwan, pork balls are most commonly served in a soup called gongwan tang (貢丸湯; pinyin: gòngwán tāng; POJ: kòng-ôan-thng), which is essentially a clear broth topped with chopped coriander leaf and  green onions. They are also served in various kinds of noodle soup, such as cart noodles and soup in Hong Kong.

In Vietnam, pork ball (thịt heo viên) may be roasted or eaten with tomato sauce.

See also
Beef ball
Fish ball
Lion's head
List of meatball dishes
Steamed meatball
Taiwanese cuisine

References

Taiwanese pork dishes
Meatballs